Juan Ramón Ruano Santana (born 29 November 1983 in Usagre, Province of Badajoz) is a Spanish footballer who plays for AD Llerenense as a midfielder.

External links

1983 births
Living people
People from Campiña Sur (Badajoz)
Sportspeople from the Province of Badajoz
Spanish footballers
Spanish expatriate footballers
Footballers from Extremadura
Association football midfielders
Segunda División players
Segunda División B players
Tercera División players
CD Badajoz players
Córdoba CF players
CD Tenerife players
Orihuela CF players
Benidorm CF footballers
Deportivo Alavés players
UD Alzira footballers
LASK players
UB Conquense footballers
Extremadura UD footballers
UD Melilla footballers
CF Villanovense players
Austrian Football Bundesliga players
Spanish expatriate sportspeople in Austria
Expatriate footballers in Austria